Events in the year 2021 in France.

Incumbents
President – Emmanuel Macron (REM)
Prime Minister – Jean Castex (REM)

Events

Ongoing — COVID-19 pandemic in France

January to March
 4 March – The government bans Génération Identitaire (Generation Identity), an Identitarian nationalist anti-immigration movement.
 5 March – Member of Parliament Sophie Auconie resigns from the National Assembly.
 7 March – Member of Parliament Olivier Dassault is killed in a plane crash.

April to June
 21 April – The Valeurs Actuelles published an open letter, with 20 retired generals and 1,000 military personnel warning the country was heading for "civil war" due to Islamist religious extremism.
 23 April - Rambouillet knife attack

July to September
 17 July – Over 100,000 people protest across France against Emmanuel Macron's plan to require COVID-19 vaccinations for health workers, along with other restrictions on unvaccinated citizens.
 23 July – 8 August – France compete at the Summer Olympics in Tokyo, Japan and win 10 gold, 12 silver, and 11 bronze medals.
 7 August
 Handball at the 2020 Summer Olympics – Men's tournament: France defeats Denmark, became the first country to claim the Olympic men's handball title for a third time.
 Volleyball at the 2020 Summer Olympics – Men's tournament: France defeats Russia, becoming the first to win gold in Tokyo.
 8 August – Handball at the 2020 Summer Olympics – Women's tournament: France defeats Russia, becoming the first to win gold in Tokyo.

October to December
 24 November – November 2021 English Channel disaster
 19 December - The Junior Eurovision Song Contest 2021 is held at the La Seine Musicale, and is won by Armenian singer Maléna with the song "Qami Qami".

Deaths

 8 February – Ghédalia Tazartès, musician (b. 1947)
 1 September – Jean-Denis Bredin, lawyer (b. 1929)
 6 September
 Jean-Pierre Adams, footballer (b. 1948)
 Jean-Paul Belmondo, actor (b. 1933)

See also

Country overviews
 France
 History of France
 History of modern France
 Outline of France
 Government of France
 Politics of France
 Years in France
 Timeline of France history
 List of French films of 2021

Related timelines for current period
 2021
 2021 in politics and government

References

 
France
France
2020s in France
Years of the 21st century in France